Canada competed at the 1992 Winter Olympics in Albertville, France. Canada has competed at every Winter Olympic Games.

Medalists

Competitors
The following is the list of number of competitors in the Games.

Alpine skiing

Men

Men's combined

Women

Women's combined

Biathlon

Men

Men's 4 x 7.5 km relay

Women

Women's 3 x 7.5 km relay

 1 A penalty loop of 150 metres had to be skied per missed target.
 2 One minute added per missed target.

Bobsleigh

Cross-country skiing

Men

 1 Starting delay based on 10 km results. 
 C = Classical style, F = Freestyle

Men's 4 × 10 km relay

Women

 2 Starting delay based on 5 km results. 
 C = Classical style, F = Freestyle

Women's 4 × 5 km relay

Curling

Curling was a demonstration sport at the 1992 Winter Olympics.

Figure skating

Men

Women

Pairs

Ice Dancing

Freestyle skiing

Men

Women

Ice hockey

Group B
Twelve participating teams were placed in two groups. After playing a round-robin, the top four teams in each group advanced to the Medal Round while the last two teams competed in the consolation round for the 9th to 12th places.

Final round
Quarter-finals

Semi-finals

Final

Leading scorers

Team Roster
 Sean Burke
 Trevor Kidd
 Sam St. Laurent
 Kevin Dahl
 Curt Giles
 Gord Hynes
 Brian Tutt
 Dave Hannan
 Dave Archibald
 Adrien Plavsic
 Eric Lindros
 Chris Lindberg
 Todd Brost
 Joé Juneau
 Randy Smith
 Jason Woolley
 Dan Ratushny
 Fabian Joseph
 Kent Manderville
 Brad Schlegel (c)
 Patrick Lebeau
 Wally Schreiber
 Dave Tippett
Head coach: Dave King

Luge

Men

(Men's) Doubles

Women

Short track speed skating

Men

Women

Ski jumping 

Men's team large hill

 1 Three (for most countries four) teams members performed two jumps each. The best three were counted.

Speed skating

Men

Women

References

 Olympic Winter Games 1992, full results by sports-reference.com

Nations at the 1992 Winter Olympics
1992
Winter Olympics